KKOH (780 kHz, "News Talk 780 KOH") is a commercial AM radio station licensed to Reno, Nevada. KKOH airs a talk radio format and is owned and operated by Cumulus Media. Studios and offices are on East Plumb Lane. It transmits from a three-tower array off Chickadee Drive.

KKOH broadcasts at 50,000 watts, the maximum power permitted by the Federal Communications Commission (FCC) for AM stations. Because 780 AM is a clear channel frequency, reserved for Class A WBBM in Chicago, KKOH must use a directional signal after sunset to avoid interfering with WBBM. A single tower is used during the day, allowing it to be heard some distance into California. It provides a strong grade B signal to Sacramento and can be heard as far as the Bay Area under the right conditions. At night, power is fed to all three towers in a directional pattern to protect WBBM. Even with this restriction, it can heard in much of the Western United States with a good radio.

Programming
Weekday mornings begin with news and information show, America in The Morning and Ross and Ryan in the Morning, co–hosted by Ross Mitchell and Ryan Nutter. Later in the day, Dan Mason (previous hosts were Rusty Humphries from 1998 to 2003 and Bill Manders from 2003 to 2011) and Jon Sanchez (along with co–hosts Jason Gaunt, Dwight Millard and Corey Edge) host local hours in afternoon drive time. The rest of the schedule is made up of nationally syndicated conservative talk shows: Dan Bongino, Sean Hannity, Mark Levin, Ben Shapiro and Red Eye Radio.

Weekends feature shows on money, health, home repair, technology and gardening, some of which are paid brokered programming. Syndicated weekend hosts include Kim Komando, Ben Shapiro (repeat), Jim Bohannon, Nevada Newsmakers with co–hosts Sam Shad and Ray Hagar, Dan Bongino (repeat), Sean Hannity (repeat), Chris Plante, Bill Cunningham and Red Eye Radio (repeat). Weather coverage is supplied by ABC Network affiliate KOLO-TV Channel 8. Most hours begin with world and national news from ABC News Radio.

History
The station began broadcasting on October 13, 1971. The original call sign was KCRL, owned by businessman E. L. Cord. It was a sister station to Reno's NBC television affiliate, KCRL-TV (now KRNV-DT). The 'CRL' in the station's call letters stood for "Circle L"—a ranch Cord owned in the Nevada desert. KCRL became well known across the West for its classical music format. Although the station lost $25,000 a month, Cord took the losses philosophically, feeling that he was providing a public service.

Its call sign was changed to KROW in 1981 and it gradually evolved into a country station.

The station's current incarnation dates from 1994. Soon after Citadel Broadcasting bought KOH, Nevada's oldest radio station (on the air since 1928), it applied to move from its longtime home at 630 AM to KROW's frequency at 780. 630 AM must reduce its power from 5,000 watts to 1,000 watts at sunset to protect clear-channel KFI in Los Angeles, at nearby 640 AM.

As part of the agreement, the FCC issued a new license to Citadel under the slightly altered call letters KKOH on March 10, 1994. Citadel concluded the advantages of broadcasting at a full 50,000 watts from the most powerful facility in northern Nevada outweighed the nostalgic value of the last three-letter call sign issued for a "new station." 630 AM became Christian contemporary KRCV.  It is now Fox Sports Radio outlet KPLY.

The station continues to trade on the KOH call letters' legacy in Reno. Nearly all verbal references drop the second "K." Citadel was later merged into current owner Cumulus Media.

References

External links
FCC History Cards for KKOH
 

1970 establishments in Nevada
Cumulus Media radio stations
News and talk radio stations in the United States
Radio stations established in 1970
KOH